Foot binding, or footbinding, was the Chinese custom of breaking and tightly binding the feet of young girls in order to change their shape and size. Feet altered by footbinding were known as lotus feet, and the shoes made for these feet were known as lotus shoes. In late imperial China, bound feet were considered a status symbol and a mark of feminine beauty. However, footbinding was a painful practice that limited the mobility of women and resulted in lifelong disabilities.

The prevalence and practice of footbinding varied over time and by region and social class. The practice may have originated among court dancers during the Five Dynasties and Ten Kingdoms period in 10th-century China, and gradually became popular among the elite during the Song dynasty. Footbinding eventually spread to lower social classes by the Qing dynasty (1636–1912). Manchu emperors attempted to ban the practice in the 17th century, but failed. In some areas, footbinding raised marriage prospects. It has been estimated that, by the 19th century, 40–50% of all Chinese women may have had bound feet, rising to almost 100% in upper-class Han Chinese women.

In the late 19th century, Christian missionaries and Chinese reformers challenged the practice. It was not until the early 20th century that the practice began to die out, following the efforts of anti-footbinding campaigns. Additionally, upper-class and urban women dropped the practice of footbinding sooner than poorer rural women. By 2007, only a small handful of elderly Chinese women whose feet had been bound were still alive.

History

Origin 

There are a number of stories about the origin of footbinding before its establishment during the Song dynasty. One of these involves the story of Pan Yunu, a favorite consort of the Southern Qi Emperor Xiao Baojuan. In the story, Pan Yunu, renowned for having delicate feet, performed a dance barefoot on a floor decorated with the design of a golden lotus, after which the Emperor, expressing admiration, said that "lotus springs from her every step!", a reference to the Buddhist legend of Padmavati, under whose feet lotus springs forth. This story may have given rise to the terms "golden lotus" or "lotus feet" used to describe bound feet; there is, however, no evidence that Consort Pan ever bound her feet.

The general view is that the practice is likely to have originated in the time of the 10th-century Emperor Li Yu of the Southern Tang, just before the Song dynasty. Li Yu created a  golden lotus decorated with precious stones and pearls, and asked his concubine, Yao Niang , to bind her feet in white silk into the shape of the crescent moon and perform a dance on the points of her feet on the lotus. Yao Niang's dance was said to be so graceful that others sought to imitate her. The binding of feet was then replicated by other upper-class women, and the practice spread.

Some of the earliest possible references to footbinding appear around 1100, when a couple of poems seemed to allude to the practice. Soon after 1148, in the earliest extant discourse on the practice of footbinding, scholar  wrote that a bound foot should be arch shaped and small. He observed that "women's footbinding began in recent times; it was not mentioned in any books from previous eras." In the 13th century, scholar  wrote the first known criticism of the practice: "Little girls not yet four or five years old, who have done nothing wrong, nevertheless are made to suffer unlimited pain to bind [their feet] small. I do not know what use this is."

The earliest archeological evidence for foot binding dates to the tombs of Huang Sheng, who died in 1243 at the age of 17, and Madame Zhou, who died in 1274. The style of bound feet found in Song dynasty tombs, where the big toe was bent upwards, appears to be different from the norm of later eras, and the excessive smallness of the feet—an ideal known as the "three-inch golden lotus"—may be a later development in the 16th century.

Later eras

At the end of the Song dynasty, men would drink from a special shoe whose heel contained a small cup. During the Yuan dynasty, some would also drink directly from the shoe itself. This practice was called "toast to the golden lotus" and lasted until the late Qing dynasty.

The first European to mention footbinding was the Italian missionary Odoric of Pordenone in the 14th century, during the Yuan dynasty. However, no other foreign visitors to Yuan China mentioned the practice, including Ibn Battuta and Marco Polo (who nevertheless noted the dainty walk of Chinese women who took very small steps), perhaps an indication that it was not a widespread or extreme practice at that time. The practice, however, was encouraged by the Mongol rulers on their Chinese subjects. The practice became increasingly common among the gentry families, later spreading to the general population, as commoners and theatre actors alike adopted footbinding. By the Ming period, the practice was no longer the preserve of the gentry, and had instead become considered a status symbol. As footbinding restricted the movement of a woman, one side effect of its rising popularity was the corresponding decline of the art of women's dance in China, and it became increasingly rare to hear about beauties and courtesans who were also great dancers after the Song era.

The Manchus issued a number of edicts to ban the practice, first in 1636 when the Manchu leader Hong Taiji declared the founding of the new Qing dynasty, then in 1638, and another in 1664 by the Kangxi Emperor. However, few Han Chinese complied with the edicts and Kangxi eventually abandoned the effort in 1668. By the 19th century, it was estimated that 40–50% of Chinese women had bound feet, and, among upper class Han Chinese women, the figure was almost 100%. Bound feet became a mark of beauty and were also a prerequisite for finding a husband. They also became an avenue for poorer women to marry up in some areas, such as Sichuan. In late 19th-century Guangdong, it was customary to bind the feet of the eldest daughter of a lower-class family who was intended to be brought up as a lady. Her younger sisters would grow up to be bond-servants or domestic slaves and be able to work in the fields, but the eldest daughter would be assumed never to have the need to work. This pride was reflected in the elegantly embroidered silk slippers and wrappings girls and women wore to cover their feet. Handmade shoes would serve to show off the embroidery skill of the wearer, as well. These shoes also served as support, as some women with bound feet might not have been able to walk without the support of their shoes, and thus would have been severely limited in their mobility. However, contrary to missionary writings, many women with bound feet were still able to walk and work in the fields, albeit with greater limitations than their non-bound counterparts.

In the 19th and early 20th century, there were dancers with bound feet as well as circus performers who stood on prancing or running horses. Women with bound feet in one village in Yunnan Province even formed a regional dance troupe to perform for tourists in the late 20th century, though age has since forced the group to retire. In other areas, women in their 70s and 80s could be found providing limited assistance to the workers in the rice fields well into the 21st century.

Decline 
Opposition to footbinding had been raised by some Chinese writers in the 18th century. In the mid-19th century, many of the leaders of the Taiping Rebellion were men of Hakka background whose women did not bind their feet, and they outlawed footbinding in areas under their control. However, the rebellion failed, and Christian missionaries, who had provided education for girls and actively discouraged what they considered a barbaric practice that had deleterious social effect on women, then played a part in changing elite opinion on footbinding through education, pamphleteering, and lobbying of the Qing court, placing emphasis on the fact that no other culture in the world practiced the custom of footbinding.

The earliest-known Western anti-footbinding society was formed in Amoy (Xiamen) in 1874. Around 60–70 Christian women in Xiamen attended a meeting presided over by a missionary John MacGowan formed the Natural Foot Society (literally Heavenly Foot Society). MacGowan held the view that footbinding was a serious problem that called into doubt the whole of Chinese civilization; he felt that "the nefarious civilization interferes with Divine Nature." Members of the Heavenly Foot Society vowed not to bind their daughters' feet. In 1895, Christian women in Shanghai led by Alicia Little, also formed a Natural Foot Society. It was also championed by the Woman's Christian Temperance Movement founded in 1883 and advocated by missionaries including Timothy Richard, who thought that Christianity could promote equality between the sexes. This missionary-led opposition had stronger impacts than earlier Han or Manchu opposition. Western missionaries established the first schools for girls, and encouraged women to end the perpetuation of the practice of footbinding. Christian missionaries also did not conceal their shock and disgust when explaining the process of footbinding to Western peers, and their descriptions shocked their audience back home.

Reform-minded Chinese intellectuals began to consider footbinding to be an aspect of their culture that needed to be eliminated. In 1883, Kang Youwei founded the Anti-Footbinding Society near Canton to combat the practice, and anti-footbinding societies sprang up across the country, with membership for the movement claimed to reach 300,000. The anti-footbinding movement, however, stressed pragmatic and patriotic reasons rather than feminist ones, arguing that abolition of footbinding would lead to better health and more efficient labor. Kang Youwei submitted a petition to the throne commenting on the fact that China had become a joke to foreigners and that "footbinding was the primary object of such ridicule."

Reformers such as Liang Qichao, influenced by Social Darwinism, also argued that it weakened the nation, since enfeebled women supposedly produced weak sons. In his "On Women's Education," Liang Qichao asserts that the root cause of national weakness inevitably lies the lack of education for women. Qichao connected education for women and footbinding: "As long as foot binding remains in practice, women's education can never flourish." Qichao was also disappointed that foreigners had opened the first schools as he thought that the Chinese should be teaching Chinese women. At the turn of the 20th century, early feminists, such as Qiu Jin, called for the end of footbinding. In 1906, Zhao Zhiqian wrote in Beijing Women's News to blame women with bound feet for being a national weakness in the eyes of other nations. Many members of anti-footbinding groups pledged to not bind their daughters' feet nor to allow their sons to marry women with bound feet. In 1902, Empress Dowager Cixi issued an anti-footbinding edict, but it was soon rescinded.

In 1912, the new Republic of China government banned footbinding, though the ban was not actively implemented, and leading intellectuals of the May Fourth Movement saw footbinding as a major symbol of China's backwardness. Provincial leaders, such as Yan Xishan in Shanxi, engaged in their own sustained campaign against footbinding with foot inspectors and fines for those who continued the practice, while regional governments of the later Nanjing regime also enforced the ban. The campaign against footbinding was successful in some regions; in one province, a 1929 survey showed that, whereas only 2.3% of girls born before 1910 had unbound feet, 95% of those born after were not bound. In a region south of Beijing, Dingxian, where over 99% of women once had bound feet, no new cases were found among those born after 1919. In Taiwan, the practice was also discouraged by the ruling Japanese from the beginning of Japanese rule, and from 1911 to 1915 it was gradually made illegal. The practice lingered on in some regions in China; in 1928, a census in rural Shanxi found that 18% of women had bound feet, while in some remote rural areas, such as Yunnan Province, it continued to be practised until the 1950s. In most parts of China, however, the practice had virtually disappeared by 1949. The practice was also stigmatized in Communist China, and the last vestiges of footbinding were stamped out, with the last new case of footbinding reported in 1957. By the 21st century, only a few elderly women in China still had bound feet. In 1999, the last shoe factory making lotus shoes, the Zhiqian Shoe Factory in Harbin, closed.

Practice

Variations and prevalence 

Footbinding was practised in various forms and its prevalence varied in different regions. A less severe form in Sichuan, called "cucumber foot" due to its slender shape, folded the four toes under but did not distort the heel or taper the ankle. Some working women in Jiangsu made a pretense of binding while keeping their feet natural. Not all women were always bound—some women once bound remained bound all through their lives, but some were only briefly bound, and some were bound only until their marriage. Footbinding was most common among women whose work involved domestic crafts and those in urban areas; it was also more common in northern China where it was widely practiced by women of all social classes, but less so in parts of southern China such as Guangdong and Guangxi where it was largely a practice of women in the provincial capitals or among the gentry. Feet were bound to their smallest in the northern provinces of Hebei, Shandong, Shanxi, and Shaanxi, but was less extreme and less common in the southern provinces of Guangdong, Guangxi, Yunnan, and Guizhou, where not all daughters of the wealthy had bound feet. Footbinding limited the mobility of girls, so they became engaged in handwork since childhood. It is thought that the necessity for female labor in the fields due to a longer crop-growing season in the South and the impracticability of bound feet working in wet rice fields limited the spread of the practice in the countryside of the South. However, some farming women bound their daughter's feet, but "the process began later than in elite families, and feet were bound more loosely among the poor."

Manchu women, as well as Mongol and Chinese women in the Eight Banners, did not bind their feet. The most a Manchu woman might do was to wrap the feet tightly to give them a slender appearance. The Manchus, wanting to emulate the particular gait that bound feet necessitated, adapted their own form of platform shoes to cause them to walk in a similar swaying manner. These Manchu platform shoes were known as "flower bowl" shoes or "horse-hoof" shoes; they have a platform generally made of wood  in height and fitted to the middle of the sole, or they have a small central tapered pedestal. Many Han Chinese in the Inner City of Beijing also did not bind their feet, and it was reported in the mid-1800s that around 50–60% of non-banner women had unbound feet. Bound feet nevertheless became a significant differentiating marker between Han women and Manchu or other banner women.

The Hakka people, however, were unusual among Han Chinese in not practising footbinding at all. Most non-Han Chinese people, such as the Manchus, Mongols, and Tibetans, did not bind their feet; however, some non-Han ethnic groups did. Footbinding was practised by the Hui Muslims in Gansu Province. The Dungan Muslims, descendants of Hui from northwestern China who fled to central Asia, were also seen practising footbinding up to 1948. In southern China, in Canton (Guangzhou), 19th century Scottish scholar James Legge noted a mosque that had a placard denouncing footbinding, saying Islam did not allow it since it constituted violating the creation of God.

Process 

The process was started before the arch of the foot had a chance to develop fully, usually between the ages of four and nine. Binding usually started during the winter months since the feet were more likely to be numb, and therefore the pain would not be as extreme.

First, each foot would be soaked in a warm mixture of herbs and animal blood; this was intended to soften the foot and aid the binding. Then, the toenails were cut back as far as possible to prevent in-growth and subsequent infections, since the toes were to be pressed tightly into the sole of the foot. To enable the size of the feet to be reduced, the toes on each foot were curled under, then pressed with great force downwards and squeezed into the sole of the foot until the toes broke.

The broken toes were held tightly against the sole of the foot while the foot was then drawn down straight with the leg and the arch of the foot was forcibly broken. The bandages were repeatedly wound in a figure-eight movement, starting at the inside of the foot at the instep, then carried over the toes, under the foot, and around the heel, the broken toes being pressed tightly into the sole of the foot. At each pass around the foot, the binding cloth was tightened, pulling the ball of the foot and the heel together, causing the broken foot to fold at the arch, and pressing the toes underneath the sole. The binding was pulled so tightly that the girl could not move her toes at all and the ends of the binding cloth were then sewn so that the girl could not loosen it.

The girl's broken feet required a great deal of care and attention, and they would be unbound regularly. Each time the feet were unbound, they were washed, the toes checked for injury, and the nails meticulously trimmed. When unbound, the broken feet were also kneaded to soften them and the soles of the girl's feet were often beaten to make the joints and broken bones more flexible. The feet were also soaked in a concoction that caused any necrotic flesh to fall off.

Immediately after this procedure, the girl's broken toes were folded back under and the feet were rebound. The bindings were pulled even tighter each time the girl's feet were rebound. This unbinding and rebinding ritual was repeated as often as possible (for the rich at least once daily, for poor peasants two or three times a week), with fresh bindings. It was generally an elder female member of the girl's family or a professional footbinder who carried out the initial breaking and ongoing binding of the feet. It was considered preferable to have someone other than the mother do it, as she might have been sympathetic to her daughter's pain and less willing to keep the bindings tight.

For most, the bound feet eventually became numb. However, once a foot had been crushed and bound, attempting to reverse the process by unbinding was painful, and the shape could not be reversed without a woman undergoing the same pain all over again.

Health issues 

The most common problem with bound feet was infection. Despite the amount of care taken in regularly trimming the toenails, they would often in-grow, becoming infected and causing injuries to the toes. Sometimes, for this reason, the girl's toenails would be peeled back and removed altogether. The tightness of the binding meant that the circulation in the feet was faulty, and the circulation to the toes was almost cut off, so any injuries to the toes were unlikely to heal and were likely to gradually worsen and lead to infected toes and rotting flesh. The necrosis of the flesh would also initially give off a foul odor, and, later, the smell may have come from various microorganisms that colonized the folds. Most of the women receiving treatment did not go out often and were disabled.

If the infection in the feet and toes entered the bones, it could cause them to soften, which could result in toes dropping off; however, this was seen as a benefit because the feet could then be bound even more tightly. Girls whose toes were more fleshy would sometimes have shards of glass or pieces of broken tiles inserted within the binding next to her feet and between her toes to cause injury and introduce infection deliberately. Disease inevitably followed infection, meaning that death from septic shock could result from footbinding, and a surviving girl was more at risk for medical problems as she grew older. It is thought that as many as 10% of girls may have died from gangrene and other infections due to footbinding.

At the beginning of the binding, many of the foot bones would remain broken, often for years. However, as the girl grew older, the bones would begin to heal. Even after the foot bones had healed, they were prone to rebreaking repeatedly, especially when the girl was in her teenage years and her feet were still soft. Bones in the girls' feet would often be deliberately broken again in order to further change the size or shape of the feet. This was especially the case with the girl's toes, which were broken multiple times as small toes were especially desirable. Older women were more likely to break hips and other bones in falls, since they could not balance securely on their feet, and were less able to rise to their feet from a sitting position. Other issues that may have arisen from footbinding included paralysis and muscular atrophy. By the turn of the century, footbinding had been exposed in photographs, X-rays, and detailed textual descriptions. These scientific investigations detailed how footbinding deformed the leg, covered the skin with cracks and sores, and altered the posture.

Views and interpretations 
There are many interpretations to the practice of footbinding. The interpretive models used include fashion (with the Chinese customs somewhat comparable to the more extreme examples of Western women's fashion such as corsetry), seclusion (sometimes evaluated as morally superior to the gender mingling in the West), perversion (the practice imposed by men with sexual perversions), inexplicable deformation, child abuse, and extreme cultural traditionalism. In the late 20th century, some feminists introduced positive overtones, reporting that it gave some women a sense of mastery over their bodies, and pride in their beauty.

Beauty and erotic appeal

Before footbinding was practised in China, admiration for small feet already existed as demonstrated by the Tang dynasty tale of Ye Xian written around 850 by Duan Chengshi. This tale of a girl who lost her shoe and then married a king who sought the owner of the shoe as only her foot was small enough to fit the shoe contains elements of the European story of Cinderella, and is thought to be one of its antecedents. For many, the bound feet were an enhancement to a woman's beauty and made her movement more dainty, and a woman with perfect lotus feet was likely to make a more prestigious marriage. Even while not much was written on the subject of footbinding prior to the latter half of the 19th century, the writings which were done on this topic, particularly by educated men, frequently alluded to the erotic nature and appeal of bound feet in their poetry. Therefore, people had greater expectations for footbinding brides. The belief that footbinding made women more desirable to men is widely used as an explanation for the spread and persistence of footbinding.

Some also considered bound feet to be intensely erotic, and Qing Dynasty sex manuals listed 48 different ways of playing with women's bound feet. Some men preferred never to see a woman's bound feet, so they were always concealed within tiny "lotus shoes" and wrappings. According to Robert van Gulik, the bound feet were also considered the most intimate part of a woman's body; in erotic art of the Qing period where the genitalia may be shown, the bound feet were never depicted uncovered. Howard Levy, however, suggests that the barely revealed bound foot may also only function as an initial tease.

An erotic effect of the bound feet was the lotus gait, the tiny steps and swaying walk of a woman whose feet had been bound. Women with such deformed feet avoided placing weight on the front of the foot and tended to walk predominantly on their heels. Walking on bound feet necessitated bending the knees slightly and swaying to maintain proper movement and balance, a dainty walk that was also considered to be erotically attractive to some men. Some men found the smell of the bound feet attractive, and some also apparently believed that bound feet would cause layers of folds to develop in the vagina, and that the thighs would become sensuously heavier and the vagina tighter. The psychoanalyst Sigmund Freud considered footbinding to be a "perversion that corresponds to foot fetishism", and that it appeased male castration anxiety.

Role of Confucianism

In the Song dynasty, the status of women declined, and a common argument is that the decline was the result of the revival of Confucianism as neo-Confucianism during the Song dynasty, and that in addition to promoting the seclusion of women and the cult of widow chastity, it also contributed to the development of footbinding. According to Robert van Gulik, the prominent Song Confucian scholar Zhu Xi stressed the inferiority of women as well as the need to keep men and women strictly separate. It was claimed by Lin Yutang among others, probably based on an oral tradition, that Zhu Xi also promoted footbinding in Fujian as a way of encouraging chastity among women, that, by restricting their movement, it would help keep men and women separate. However, historian Patricia Ebrey suggests that this story might be fictitious, and argued that the practice arose so as to emphasize the gender distinction during a period of societal change in the Song dynasty.

Some Confucian moralists in fact disapproved of the erotic associations of footbinding, and unbound women were also praised. The Neo-Confucian Cheng Yi was said to be against footbinding and his family and descendants did not bind their feet. Modern Confucian scholars such as Tu Weiming also dispute any causal link between neo-Confucianism and footbinding. It has been noted that Confucian doctrine in fact prohibits mutilation of the body as people should not "injure even the hair and skin of the body received from mother and father". It is however argued that such injunction applies less to women, rather it is meant to emphasize the sacred link between sons and their parents. Furthermore, it is argued that Confucianism institutionalized the family system in which women are called upon to sacrifice themselves for the good of the family, a system that fostered such practice.

Historian Dorothy Ko proposed that footbinding may be an expression of the Confucian ideals of civility and culture in the form of correct attire or bodily adornment, and that footbinding was seen as a necessary part of being feminine as well as being civilized. Footbinding was often classified in Chinese encyclopedia as clothing or a form of bodily embellishment rather than mutilation; one from 1591, for example, placed footbinding in a section on "Female Adornments" that included hairdos, powders, and ear-piercings. According to Ko, the perception of footbinding as a civilized practice may be evinced from a Ming dynasty account that mentioned a proposal to "entice [the barbarians] to civilize their customs" by encouraging footbinding among their womenfolk. The practice was also carried out only by women on girls, and it served to emphasize the distinction between male and female, an emphasis that began from an early age. Anthropologist Fred Blake argued that the practice of footbinding was a form of discipline undertaken by women themselves, and perpetuated by women on their daughters, so as to inform their daughters of their role and position in society, and to support and participate in the neo-Confucian way of being civilized.

Feminist perspective

Footbinding is often seen by feminists as an oppressive practice against women who were victims of a sexist culture. It is also widely seen as a form of violence against women. Bound feet rendered women dependent on their families, particularly the men, as they became largely restricted to their homes. Thus, the practice ensured that women were much more reliant on their husbands. The early Chinese feminist Qiu Jin, who underwent the painful process of unbinding her own bound feet, attacked footbinding and other traditional practices. She argued that women, by retaining their small bound feet, made themselves subservient as it would mean women imprisoning themselves indoors. She believed that women should emancipate themselves from oppression, that girls can ensure their independence through education, and that they should develop new mental and physical qualities fitting for the new era. The ending of the practice is seen as a significant event in the process of female emancipation in China, and a major event in the history of Chinese feminism.

In the late 20th century, some feminists have pushed back against the prevailing Western critiques of footbinding, arguing that the presumption that footbinding was done solely for the sexual pleasure of men denies the agency and cultural influence of women. Although some authors have made the claim that footbinding is an acceptable cultural practice, the majority remain highly critical of the practice and seek only to reframe the critique in a less Western-centric light.

Other interpretations
Some scholars such as Laurel Bossen and Hill Gates reject the notion that bound feet in China were considered more beautiful, or that it was a means of male control over women, a sign of class status, or a chance for women to marry well (in general, bound women did not improve their class position by marriage). Footbinding is believed to have spread from elite women to civilian women, and there were large differences in each region. The body and labor of unmarried daughters belonged to their parents, thereby the boundaries between work and kinship for women were blurred. They argued that foot binding was an instrumental means to reserve women to handwork, and can be seen as a way by mothers to tie their daughters down, train them in handwork, and keep them close at hand.

Footbinding was common when women could do light industry, but where women were required to do heavy farm work they often did not bind their feet because it hindered physical work. These scholars argued that the coming of the mechanized industry at the end of the 19th century and the beginning of the 20th century, such as the introduction of industrial textile processes, resulted in a loss of light handwork for women, removing a reason to maintain the practice. Mechanization resulted in women who worked at home facing a crisis. Coupled with changes in politics and people's consciousness, the practice of foot binding disappeared in China forever after two generations. More specifically, the 1842 Treaty of Nanjing (after the first Opium War) opened five cities as treaty pors where foreigners could live and trade. This led to foreign citizens residing in the area, where many proselytized as Christian missionaries. These foreigners condemned many long-standing Chinese cultural practices like footbinding as "uncivilized" - marking the beginning of the end for the centuries-long practice.

It has been argued that while the practice started out as a fashion, it persisted because it became an expression of Han identity after the Mongols invaded China in 1279, and later the Manchus' conquest in 1644, as it was then practised only by Han women. During the Qing dynasty, attempts were made by the Manchus to ban the practice but failed, and it has been argued the attempts at banning may have in fact led to a spread of the practice among Han Chinese in the 17th and 18th centuries.

In literature, film, and television

The bound foot has played a prominent part in many media works, both Chinese and non-Chinese, modern and traditional. These depictions are sometimes based on observation or research and sometimes on rumors or supposition. Sometimes, as in the case of Pearl Buck's The Good Earth (1931), the accounts are relatively neutral or empirical, implying respect for Chinese culture. Sometimes, the accounts seem intended to rouse like-minded Chinese and foreign opinion to abolish the custom, and sometimes the accounts imply condescension or contempt for China.

 Quoted in the Jin Ping Mei: "displaying her exquisite feet, three inches long and no wider than a thumb, very pointed and with high insteps."
 Flowers in the Mirror (1837) by Ju-Chen Li includes chapters set in the "Country of Women", where men bear children and have bound feet.
 The Three-Inch Golden Lotus (1994) by Feng Jicai presents a satirical picture of the movement to abolish the practice, which is seen as part of Chinese culture.
 In the film The Inn of the Sixth Happiness (1958), Ingrid Bergman portrays a British missionary to China Gladys Aylward, who is assigned as a foreigner the task by a local Mandarin to unbind the feet of young women, an unpopular order that the civil government had failed to fulfil. Later, the children are able to escape troops by walking miles to safety.
 Ruthanne Lum McCunn wrote a biographical novel, Thousand Pieces of Gold (1981, adapted into a 1991 film), about Polly Bemis, a Chinese American pioneer woman. It describes her feet being bound and later unbound when she needed to help her family with farm labor.
 Emily Prager's short story "A Visit from the Footbinder", from her collection of short stories of the same name (1982), describes the last few hours of a young Chinese girl's childhood before the professional footbinder arrives to initiate her into the adult woman's life of beauty and pain.
 Jung Chang's family autobiography Wild Swans presents the story of Yu-fang, the grandmother, who had bound feet from the age of two.
 Lisa Loomer's play The Waiting Room (1994) deals with themes of body modification. One of the three main characters is an 18th-century Chinese woman who arrives in a modern hospital waiting room, seeking medical help for complications resulting from her bound feet. She describes the foot-binding process, as well as the physical and psychological harm her bound feet have caused.
 Lensey Namioka's novel Ties that Bind, Ties that Break (1999) follows a girl named Ailin in China who refuses to have her feet bound, which comes to affect her future.
 Lisa See's novel Snow Flower and the Secret Fan (2005) is about two Chinese girls who are destined to be friends. The novel is based upon the sacrifices women make to be married and includes the two girls being forced into getting their feet bound. The book was adapted into a 2011 film directed by Wayne Wang.
 The Filipino horror film Feng Shui and its sequel Feng Shui 2 feature a ghost of a foot-bound woman inhabits a bagua and cursed those who holds the item.
 Lisa See's novel China Dolls (2014) describes Chinese family traditions including footbinding.
 Xiran Jay Zhao's novel Iron Widow (2021) is set in a futuristic medieval China that still practices footbinding. The main character, Wu Zetian, had her feet bound in childhood and suffers from chronic pain due to it.
 Edward Rutherfurd's novel China: An Epic Novel, is set in late Qing Dynasty China, when footbinding was still common practice among Han Chinese in the north. Bright Moon, the daughter of a main character Mei-Ling, has her feet bound to increase her chances of a good marriage, and the practice is described in detail. The character soon resents that she has her feet bound, as it causes her severe pain, and stops her from participating in many activities.
 In British TV show Luther, Season 3, Episode 2 foot fetishist serial killer mentions that foot binding as reason for his sexual obsession. He read about it in an article as child. He then proceeds to explain how anatomical changes in muscles and gait "strengthened their vaginas".

See also 
 Artificial cranial deformation
 Body modification
 Foot Emancipation Society
 Women in ancient and imperial China

Explanatory notes

Citations

References and further reading 
 Berg, Eugene E., MD, "Chinese Footbinding".  Radiology Review – Orthopaedic Nursing 24, no. 5 (September/October) 66–67
 Berger, Elizabeth, Liping Yang, and Wa Ye. "Foot binding in a Ming dynasty cemetery near Xi'an, China". International journal of paleopathology 24 (2019): 79–88.
 Bossen, Laurel, and Hill Gates. Bound feet, young hands: tracking the demise of footbinding in village China (Stanford University Press, 2017).
 Brown, Melissa J., and Damian Satterthwaite-Phillips. "Economic correlates of footbinding: Implications for the importance of Chinese daughters' labor". PLOS ONE 13.9 (2018): e0201337. online
 Brown, Melissa J., et al., "Marriage Mobility and Footbinding in Pre-1949 Rural China: A Reconsideration of Gender, Economics, and Meaning in Social Causation". Journal of Asian Studies (2012), Vol. 71 Issue 4, pp 1035–1067 
  Review article. 
 Cassel, Susie Lan (2007). ...the Binding Altered Not only My Feet but My Whole Character': Footbinding and First-World Feminism in Chinese American Literature". Journal of Asian American Studies. Vol. 10 (1): 31–58. Project Muse and Ethnic Newswatch.
 Fan Hong (1997) Footbinding, Feminism and Freedom. London: Frank Cass
 Hughes, Roxane.  Ambivalent Orientalism: Footbinding in Chinese American History, Culture and Literature. Diss. Université de Lausanne, Faculté des lettres, 2017.
 Ko, Dorothy (2005) Cinderella's Sisters: A Revisionist History of Footbinding. Los Angeles: University of California Press.
 
 
 Ping, Wang. Aching for Beauty: Footbinding in China.  New York: Anchor Books, 2002.
 Shepherd, John R. "The Qing, the Manchus, and Footbinding: Sources and Assumptions Under Scrutiny." Frontiers of History in China 11.2 (2016): 279–322.
 
 The Virtual Museum of The City of San Francisco, "Chinese Foot Binding – Lotus Shoes"

 Attributution

External links 
 

Body modification
Chinese women
Controversies in China
Foot
Foot fetishism
Mutilation
Violence against women in China